Salvador Alonso (born September 13, 1974 in Buenos Aires) is a chess Grandmaster (2009).

In 2012 he won the ITT Programa de alto Rendimiento tournament in Uruguay.

In January 2016 Alonso won, 1.5 pts above number two, the ITT CXG Marcel Duchamp Memorial tournament.

In the 6th Arica Open in 2019 he tied 2nd-8th place with Jose Eduardo Martinez Alcantara, Deivy Vera Siguenas, Renato R. Quintiliano Pinto, Cristobal Henriquez Villagra, Nikita Petrov, and Diego Saul Rod Flores Quillas.

References

External links 
 
 

Argentine chess players

1974 births
Living people
Chess grandmasters
People from Buenos Aires